Naya Gaun may refer to:

Naya Gaun, Bheri, Nepal
Naya Gaun, Rapti, Nepal